Lieutenant Colonel (Retd.) Quazi Sazzad Ali Zahir (born April 11, 1951) is a veteran of the Bangladesh Liberation War. The Bangladesh government awarded him the Bir Protik gallantary award for his bravery in the war. He was conferred with the Independence Award, Bangladesh's highest civilian in 2013 and India's fourth highest civilian award the Padma Shri on November 9, 2021.

Early life 
Zaheer was born in Chausai, Daudkandi Upazila, Comilla District on 11 April 1951. in East Pakistan now Bangladesh.

Career 
Zahir joined the Pakistan Army at the end of 1969 as a cadet. In 1971, he was training as a senior cadet at the Kakul Military Academy in Pakistan.

Zahir was commissioned in the Artillery Corps of the Pakistan Army in August. Posting is in 6th Field Artillery Regiment Sialkot. When the Bangladesh Liberation war started, he fled from Pakistan at the end of August and came to India to join the war. He crossed the border with Pak Army deployment maps stuffed inside his boots and Rs. 20 in his pocket. Initially he was considered to be a Pakistani spy sent to distract the Indian Army prior to the launch of an invasion. He was interrogated by Indian Army officials before being taken to Pathankot for further grilling. Here he produced maps of troop deployments across the border. When established that he was not a spy but was a Pak defector who wanted to help with the war effort, he was sent to Delhi and lodged up in safe house for a further period of 9 months.

Zahir joined the Bangladesh Liberation war in September 1971. He organized the 2nd Artillery Force under Sector 4 in the Sylhet region. At that time the Indian government gave six 105 mm artillery to the Mukti Bahini and with that a field artillery battery was formed for the Mukti Bahini. It is named Raushan Ara Battery. He was the co-captain of this group. Since October, the battery had assisted the Mukti Bahini Z Force in the greater Sylhet region with artillery fire support in various battles.

After the liberation war, he has been at the vanguard of educating the next generation about all that happened during those turbulent years, during which millions of Bangladeshi patriots were tortured and sacrificed their lives for the sake of freedom. Among his other accomplishments, he pioneered the concept of producing graphic novels for children, focusing on the Mukti Joddhas' martyrdom and the Indian Army's role in the liberation of Bangladesh.

In 2013, Zahir was awarded the Bangladesh Independence Award, the highest civilian award, for his contribution to the liberation war.

Zahir approached Prime Minister Sheikh Hasina to provide award and recognition to Indian soldiers killed in the Bangladesh Liberation war. He is co-coordinating the project with the Government of Bangladesh to provide crests to Indian soldiers killed in the war. He founded Shuddhoi Muktijoddho to provide recognition to Tribal veterans of Bangladesh Liberation war.

He has been awarded Padma Shri for his contribution in the field of Public Affairs on 2021 by the president of India Shri Ramnath Kovind.

Awards and honours
  – Bir Protik Award, fourth highest gallantry award in Bangladesh.
  – Swadhinata Padak in 2013, highest civilian award in Bangladesh.
  – Padma Shri in 2021, fourth highest civilian award in India,

References 

1951 births
Recipients of the Bir Protik
Living people
Recipients of the Independence Day Award
People from Comilla District
Bangladesh Army officers
Mukti Bahini personnel
Recipients of the Padma Shri